Carnival was a British glamour photography magazine first published in 1955. It was published by Liverpolitan Limited of Birkenhead, England. It was published in a  "pocket" format. The first issue contained pictorials of Adrienne Corri and Shirley Ann Field.

It was the sister magazine of Fiesta magazine (not to be confused with the later magazine of the same title), published from 1956 to 1959.

References 

Magazines established in 1955
Magazines disestablished in 1959
Photography magazines
Defunct magazines published in the United Kingdom
Visual arts magazines published in the United Kingdom